The Roman Catholic Diocese of Socorro y San Gil is a diocese located in the cities of Socorro and San Gil in the Ecclesiastical province of Bucaramanga in Colombia.

History
 20 March 1895: Established as Diocese of Socorro from the Diocese of Nueva Pamplona
 19 January 1928: Renamed as Diocese of Socorro y San Gil

Bishops

Ordinaries
 Bishops of Socorro
Evaristo Blanco (1897.04.09 – 1909.03.27), appointed Bishop of Nueva Pamplona
Francesco Cristoforo Toro (1910.10.18 – 1913.12.16), appointed Bishop of Santa Marta
Antonio Vincenzo Arenas (1914.05.28 – 1922.07.12)
 Bishops of Socorro y San Gil
Leonida Medina (1923.03.07 – 1947.07.19)
Angel Maria Ocampo Berrio, S.J. (1947.07.19 – 1950.12.06), appointed Bishop of Tunja
Aníbal Muñoz Duque (1951.04.08 – 1952.12.18), appointed Bishop of Bucaramanga; future Cardinal
Pedro José Rivera Mejía (1953.02.20 – 1975.10.25)
Ciro Alfonso Gómez Serrano (1975.10.25 – 1980.01.19)
Víctor Manuel López Forero (1980.12.06 – 1985.06.07), appointed Bishop of Colombia, Military
Jorge Leonardo Gómez Serna, O.P. (1986.03.06 – 2001.11.03), appointed Bishop of Magangué
Ismael Rueda Sierra (2003.06.27 – 2009.02.13), appointed Archbishop of Bucaramanga
Carlos Germán Mesa Ruiz (2010.02.02 – 2019.12.12)
Luis Augusto Campos Flórez (2019.12.12 - Present)

Coadjutor bishops
Ángel María Ocampo Berrio, S.J. (1942-1947)
Ciro Alfonso Gómez Serrano (1972-1975)

Other priests of this diocese who became bishops
Rafael Afanador y Cadena, appointed Bishop of Nueva Pamplona in 1916
José Joaquín Flórez Hernández, appointed Bishop of Duitama in 1955
José de Jesús Pimiento Rodriguez, appointed Auxiliary Bishop of Pasto in 1955; future Cardinal
Gustavo Martínez Frías, appointed Bishop of Ipiales in 1987
Luis José Rueda Aparicio, appointed Bishop of Montelibano in 2012

See also
Roman Catholicism in Colombia

Sources

External links
 Catholic Hierarchy
 GCatholic.org

Roman Catholic dioceses in Colombia
Roman Catholic Ecclesiastical Province of Bucaramanga
Religious organizations established in 1895
Roman Catholic dioceses and prelatures established in the 19th century
1895 establishments in Colombia